ABRS Management and Technology Institute is a Hong Kong based continuing education and training institute established in 1990. and registered with the Education Bureau since 1994.

Over 20,000 students in Hong Kong have attended courses offered by ABRS since it began operating.

Current programs
ABRS offers courses preparing for a degree from the following UK institutions:

 University of Greenwich
 Bachelor of Science (Hons) in Computing
 Bachelor (Hons) of Business Administration
 Bachelor of Arts (Hons) in Accounting and Finance
 Master of Science in Finance and Investment
 Master of Science in Information System Management
 NCC Education
 Postgraduate Diploma in Strategic Business IT
 Institute of Administrative Management
 Advanced Diploma
 Institute for Management of Information Systems
 Advanced Diploma

Partnerships

ABRS has established a strong international network / affiliation / partnership with leading universities, IT vendors, professional bodies and testing organizations to deliver reputable training, education, elearning and certification testing / examination services.

 Professional Institutions
 Association of Certified and Chartered Accountants
 Association of International Accountants
 British Computer Society
 Hong Kong Institute of Accredited Accounting Technicians
 Institute of Administrative Management
 Institute for Certification of Computing Professionals
 Institute for Management of Information Systems
 NCC Education
 Project Management Institute

 Universities
 Chinese Universities Extramural Department (1990–1994)
 Heriot-Watt University (2000–2005) BBA, MBA
 University of Greenwich: BSc (Hons) in Computing (since 2000), BA (Hons) Accounting and Finance (since 2004), BA (Hons) in Business Administration (since 2007), Master in Information Systems Management (since 2005), MSc in Finance and Investment Analysis (since 2009)
 University of Lincoln (1997–2002) BBA and BABIS
 University of Sydney Graduate School of Business / Australian Graduate School of Management (1995–2000) Advanced Certificate, Graduate Diploma, Master of Management, MBA
 University of Wollongong (2001–2004) Master of Information Technology Management and Master of Industry Based IT

References

External links
 

Educational institutions established in 1990
Universities in Hong Kong
1990 establishments in Hong Kong